The Magic Flute, K. 620, is an opera in two acts by Wolfgang Amadeus Mozart to a German libretto by Emanuel Schikaneder. The work is in the form of a Singspiel, a popular form during the time it was written that included both singing and spoken dialogue. The work premiered on 30 September 1791 at Schikaneder's theatre, the Freihaus-Theater auf der Wieden in Vienna, just two months before the composer's premature death. Still a staple of the opera repertory, its popularity was reflected by two immediate sequels, Peter Winter's Das Labyrinth oder Der Kampf mit den Elementen. Der Zauberflöte zweyter Theil (1798) and a fragmentary libretto by Johann Wolfgang von Goethe titled The Magic Flute Part Two.

The allegorical plot was influenced by Schikaneder and Mozart's interest in Freemasonry and concerns the initiation of Prince Tamino. Enlisted by the Queen of the Night to rescue her daughter Pamina from the high priest Sarastro, Tamino comes to admire the high ideals of the latter and he and Pamina both join Sarastro's community, while the Queen and her allies are vanquished.

Composition

The opera was the culmination of a period of increasing involvement by Mozart with Schikaneder's theatrical troupe, which since 1789 had been the resident company at the Theater auf der Wieden. Mozart was a close friend of one of the singer-composers of the troupe, tenor Benedikt Schack (the first Tamino), and had contributed to the compositions of the troupe, which were often collaboratively written. Mozart's participation increased with his contributions to the 1790 collaborative opera Der Stein der Weisen (The Philosopher's Stone), including the duet ("Nun liebes Weibchen", K. 625/592a) among other passages. Like The Magic Flute, Der Stein der Weisen was a fairy-tale opera and can be considered a kind of precursor; it employed much the same cast in similar roles.

The libretto for The Magic Flute, written by Schikaneder, is thought by scholars to be based on many sources. Some works of literature current in Vienna in Schikaneder's day that may have served as sources include the medieval romance Yvain by Chrétien de Troyes, the novel Life of Sethos by Jean Terrasson, and the essay "On the mysteries of the Egyptians" by Ignaz von Born. The libretto is also a natural continuation of a series of fairy tale operas produced at the time by Schikaneder's troupe, including an adaptation of Sophie Seyler's Singspiel Oberon as well as Der Stein der Weisen. Especially for the role of Papageno, the libretto draws on the Hanswurst tradition of the Viennese popular theatre. Many scholars also acknowledge an influence of Freemasonry.

It appears that in this opera two references to Antonio Salieri's music are included. The first is that the Papageno–Papagena duet is similar to the Cucuzze cavatina in Salieri's Prima la musica e poi le parole. Both are centred around musical-textual playfulness with humorous bird-like utterances of pseudo-Italian words. The Magic Flute also echoes Salieri's music in that Papageno's whistle is based on a motif borrowed from Salieri's Concerto for Clavicembalo in B-flat major.

Premiere and reception

The opera was premiered in Vienna on 30 September 1791 at the suburban Freihaus-Theater auf der Wieden. Mozart conducted the orchestra, Schikaneder himself played Papageno, while the role of the Queen of the Night was sung by Mozart's sister-in-law Josepha Hofer.

On the reception of the opera, Mozart scholar Maynard Solomon writes:

As Mozart's letters show, he was very pleased to have achieved such a success. Solomon continues:

The opera celebrated its 100th performance in November 1792, though Mozart did not have the pleasure of witnessing this milestone, as he had died on 5 December 1791. The opera was first performed outside Vienna (21 September 1792) in Lemberg, then in Prague. It then made "triumphal progress through Germany's opera houses great and small", and with the early 19th century spread to essentially all the countries of Europe—and eventually, everywhere in the world—where opera is cultivated.

As Branscombe documents, the earlier performances were often of highly altered, sometimes even mutilated, versions of the opera (see Ludwig Wenzel Lachnith). Productions of the past century have tended to be more faithful to Mozart's music, though faithful rendering of Mozart and Schikaneder's original (quite explicit) stage directions and dramatic vision continues to be rare; with isolated exceptions, modern productions strongly reflect the creative preferences of the stage director.

The Magic Flute is currently among the most frequently performed of all operas.

First publication
On 28 December 1791, three and a half weeks after Mozart's death, his widow Constanze offered to send a manuscript score of The Magic Flute to the electoral court in Bonn. Nikolaus Simrock published this text in the first full-score edition (Bonn, 1814), claiming that it was "in accordance with Mozart's own wishes" (Allgemeine musikalische Zeitung, 13 September 1815).

Themes

The Magic Flute is noted for its prominent Masonic elements, although some scholars hold that the Masonic influence is exaggerated. Schikaneder and Mozart were Freemasons, as was Ignaz Alberti, engraver and printer of the first libretto. The opera is also influenced by Enlightenment philosophy and can be regarded as advocating enlightened absolutism. The Queen of the Night is seen by some to represent a dangerous form of obscurantism, by others to represent Roman Catholic Empress Maria Theresa, who banned Freemasonry from Austria. Still others see the Roman Catholic Church itself, which was strongly anti-Masonic. Likewise, the literature repeatedly addresses the fact that the central theme of the work is not only "love," but also becoming a better person by overcoming trials (similar to Wagner's Parsifal later on).

Roles

The names of the performers at the premiere are taken from a preserved playbill for this performance (at right), which does not give full names; "Hr." = Herr, Mr.; "Mme." = Madame, Mrs.; "Mlle." = Mademoiselle, Miss.

While the female roles in the opera are assigned to different voice types, the playbill for the premiere performance referred to all of the female singers as "sopranos". The casting of the roles relies on the actual vocal range of the part.

Instrumentation 

The work is scored for two flutes (one doubling on piccolo), two oboes, two clarinets (doubling basset horns), two bassoons, two horns, two trumpets, three trombones (alto, tenor, and bass), timpani and strings. It also requires a four-part chorus for several numbers (notably the finales of each act). This instrument has since been lost to history, though modern day scholars believe it to be a keyed glockenspiel, which is usually replaced with a celesta in modern-day performances.

Charles Rosen has remarked on the character of Mozart's orchestration:
Die Zauberflöte has the greatest variety of orchestral color that the eighteenth century was to know; the very lavishness, however, is paradoxically also an economy as each effect is a concentrated one, each one—Papageno's whistle, the Queen of the Night's coloratura, the bells, Sarastro's trombones, even the farewell in scene 1 for clarinets and pizzicato strings—a single dramatic stroke."

Synopsis

The opera begins with a brassy cadence associated with the Priests of the Temple of Wisdom, and transitions to a lively fugue, which Mozart composed after the other parts of the opera were complete.

Act 1

Scene 1: A rough, rocky landscape

Tamino, a handsome prince lost in a distant land, is pursued by a serpent and asks the gods to save him (aria: "" / Help! Help!, segued into trio "" / Die, monster, by our might!). He faints, and three ladies, attendants of the Queen of the Night, appear and kill the serpent. They find the unconscious prince extremely attractive, and each of them tries to convince the other two to leave. After arguing, they reluctantly decide to leave together.

Tamino wakes up, and is surprised to find himself still alive. Papageno enters dressed as a bird. He describes his life as a bird-catcher, complaining he has no wife or girlfriend (aria: "" / The birdcatcher am I indeed). Tamino introduces himself to Papageno, thinking Papageno killed the serpent. Papageno happily takes the credit – claiming he strangled it with his bare hands. The three ladies suddenly reappear and instead of giving Papageno wine, cake and figs, they give him water, a stone and place a padlock over his mouth as a warning not to lie. They give Tamino a portrait of the Queen of the Night's daughter Pamina, with whom Tamino falls instantly in love (aria:  / This image is enchantingly beautiful).

The ladies return and tell Tamino that Pamina has been captured by Sarastro, whom they describe as a powerful, evil demon. Tamino vows to rescue Pamina. The Queen of the Night appears and promises Tamino that Pamina will be his if he rescues her from Sarastro (Recitative and aria:  / Oh, tremble not, my dear son!). The Queen leaves and the ladies remove the padlock from Papageno's mouth with a warning not to lie any more. They give Tamino a magic flute which has the power to change sorrow into joy. They give Papageno magic bells for protection, telling him to go with Tamino. The ladies introduce three child-spirits, who will guide Tamino and Papageno to Sarastro's temple. Together Tamino and Papageno set forth (Quintet: "Hm! Hm! Hm! Hm!").

Scene 2: A room in Sarastro's palace

Pamina is dragged in by Sarastro's slaves, apparently having tried to escape. Monostatos, a blackamoor and chief of the slaves, orders the slaves to chain her and leave him alone with her. Papageno, sent ahead by Tamino to help find Pamina, enters (Trio: "" / Just come in, you fine little dove!). Monostatos and Papageno are each terrified by the other's strange appearance and both flee. Papageno returns and announces to Pamina that her mother has sent Tamino to save her. Pamina rejoices to hear that Tamino is in love with her. She offers sympathy and hope to Papageno, who longs for a wife. Together they reflect on the joys and sacred duties of marital love (duet: "" / In men, who feel love).

Finale. Scene 3: A grove in front of a temple
The three child-spirits lead Tamino to Sarastro's temple, promising that if he remains patient, wise and steadfast, he will succeed in rescuing Pamina (Quartet: "" / This path leads you to your goal). Tamino approaches the left-hand entrance and is denied access by voices from within. The same happens when he goes to the entrance on the right. But from the entrance in the middle, an old priest appears and lets Tamino in. (The old priest is referred to as "The Speaker" in the libretto, but his role is a singing role.) He tells Tamino that Sarastro is benevolent, not evil, and that he should not trust the Queen of the Night. He promises that Tamino's confusion will be lifted when Tamino approaches the temple in a spirit of friendship. Tamino plays his magic flute. Animals appear and dance, enraptured, to his music. Tamino hears Papageno's pipes sounding offstage, and hurries off to find him (aria: "" / How strong is thy magic tone).

Papageno and Pamina enter, searching for Tamino (trio: "" / Swift steps, ready courage). They are recaptured by Monostatos and his slaves. Papageno plays his magic bells, and Monostatos and his slaves begin to dance, and exit the stage, still dancing, mesmerised by the beauty of the music (chorus: "" / That sounds so splendid). Papageno and Pamina hear the sound of Sarastro's retinue approaching. Papageno is frightened and asks Pamina what they should say. She answers that they must tell the truth. Sarastro enters, with a crowd of followers. (chorus: "" / Long live Sarastro!) Pamina falls at Sarastro's feet and confesses that she tried to escape because Monostatos had forced his attentions on her. Sarastro receives her kindly and assures her that he wishes only for her happiness. But he refuses to return her to her mother, whom he describes as a proud, headstrong woman, and a bad influence on those around her. Pamina, he says, must be guided by a man.

Monostatos brings in Tamino. The two lovers see one another for the first time and embrace, causing indignation among Sarastro's followers. Monostatos tells Sarastro that he caught Papageno and Pamina trying to escape, and demands a reward. Sarastro, however, punishes Monostatos for his lustful behaviour toward Pamina, and sends him away. He announces that Tamino must undergo trials of wisdom in order to become worthy as Pamina's husband. The priests declare that virtue and righteousness will sanctify life and make mortals like gods ("" / If virtue and justice).

Act 2

Scene 1: A grove of palms
The council of priests of Isis and Osiris, headed by Sarastro, enters to the sound of a solemn march. Sarastro tells the priests that Tamino is ready to undergo the ordeals that will lead to enlightenment. He invokes the gods Isis and Osiris, asking them to protect Tamino and Pamina (Aria and chorus: " / O Isis and Osiris").

Scene 2: The courtyard of the Temple of Ordeal
Tamino and Papageno are led in by two priests for the first trial. The two priests advise Tamino and Papageno of the dangers ahead of them, warn them of women's wiles and swear them to silence (Duet: " / Keep yourselves from women's tricks"). The three ladies appear and try to frighten Tamino and Papageno into speaking. (Quintet: "" / How, how, how) Papageno cannot resist answering the ladies, but Tamino remains aloof, angrily instructing Papageno not to listen to the ladies' threats and to keep quiet. Seeing that Tamino will not speak to them, the ladies withdraw in confusion.

Scene 3: A garden
Pamina is asleep. Monostatos approaches and gazes upon her with rapture. (Aria: "" / All feel the joys of love) He is about to kiss the sleeping Pamina, when the Queen of the Night appears. Monostatos hides. In response to the Queen's questioning, Pamina explains that Tamino is joining Sarastro's brotherhood and that she is thinking of accompanying him. The Queen is not pleased. She explains that her husband, the previous owner of the temple, on his deathbed gave the ownership to Sarastro instead of to her, rendering the Queen powerless (this is in the original libretto, but is usually omitted from modern productions, to shorten the scene with Pamina and her mother). She gives Pamina a dagger, ordering her to kill Sarastro with it and threatening to disown her if she does not. (Aria: "" / Hell's vengeance boils in my heart). She leaves. Monostatos returns and tries to force Pamina's love by threatening to reveal the Queen's plot, but Sarastro enters and drives him off. Pamina begs Sarastro to forgive her mother and he reassures her that revenge and cruelty have no place in his domain (Aria: "" / Within these sacred halls).

Scene 4: A hall in the Temple of Ordeal
Tamino and Papageno are led in by priests, who remind them that they must remain silent. Papageno complains of thirst. An old woman enters and offers Papageno a cup of water. He drinks and teasingly asks whether she has a boyfriend. She replies that she does and that his name is Papageno. She disappears as Papageno asks for her name, and the three child-spirits bring in food, the magic flute, and the bells, sent from Sarastro (Trio: "" / We welcome you a second time). Tamino begins to play the flute, which summons Pamina. She tries to speak with him, but Tamino, bound by his vow of silence, cannot answer her, and Pamina begins to believe that he no longer loves her. (Aria: "" / Oh, I feel it, it is gone) She leaves in despair.

Scene 5: The pyramids

The priests celebrate Tamino's successes so far, and pray that he will succeed and become worthy of their order (Chorus: "" / O Isis and Osiris). Pamina is brought in and Sarastro instructs Pamina and Tamino to bid each other farewell before the greater trials ahead, alarming them by describing it as their "final farewell". (Trio: Sarastro, Pamina, Tamino – "" / Shall I see you no more, dear one? — Note: In order to preserve the continuity of Pamina's suicidal feelings, this trio is sometimes performed earlier in act 2, preceding or immediately following Sarastro's aria "".) They exit and Papageno enters. The priests grant his request for a glass of wine and he expresses his desire for a wife. (Aria: "" / A girl or a woman). The elderly woman reappears and warns him that unless he immediately promises to marry her, he will be imprisoned forever. When Papageno promises to love her faithfully (muttering that he will only do this until something better comes along), she is transformed into the young and pretty Papagena. Papageno rushes to embrace her, but the priests drive him back, telling him that he is not yet worthy of her.

Finale. Scene 6: A garden

The three child-spirits hail the dawn. They observe Pamina, who is contemplating suicide because she believes Tamino has abandoned her. The child-spirits restrain her and reassure her of Tamino's love. (Quartet: "" / To herald the morning, soon will shine). There is then a scene change without interrupting the music, leading into scene 7.

Scene 7: Outside the Temple of Ordeal
Two men in armor lead in Tamino. They recite one of the formal creeds of Isis and Osiris, promising enlightenment to those who successfully overcome the fear of death ("" / He who walks this path weighed down with cares). This recitation takes the musical form of a Baroque chorale prelude, to a tune inspired by Martin Luther's hymn "Ach Gott, vom Himmel sieh darein" (Oh God, look down from heaven). Tamino declares that he is ready to be tested. Pamina calls to him from offstage. The men in armour assure him that the trial by silence is over and he is free to speak with her. Pamina enters and declares her intention to undergo the remaining trials with him. She hands him the magic flute to help them through the trials (" / Oh, what luck, my Tamino!"). Protected by the music of the magic flute, they pass unscathed through chambers of fire and water. Offstage, the priests hail their triumph and invite the couple to enter the temple. There is then a scene change without interrupting the music, leading into scene 8.

Scene 8: A garden with a tree 
Papageno despairs at having lost Papagena and decides to hang himself (Aria/Quartet: "" / Papagena! Papagena! Papagena! Dear woman, dear dove, my beauty) The three child-spirits appear and stop him. They advise him to play his magic bells to summon Papagena. She appears and, united, the happy couple stutter in astonishment and make bird-like courting sounds at each other. They plan their future and dream of the many children they will have together (Duet: "Pa... pa... pa..."). There is then a scene change without interrupting the music, leading into scene 9.

Scene 9: A rocky landscape outside the temple; night
The traitorous Monostatos appears with the Queen of the Night and her three ladies. They plot to destroy the temple ("" / Just quiet, quiet) and the Queen confirms that she has promised her daughter Pamina to Monostatos. But before the conspirators can enter the temple, they are magically cast out into eternal night. There is then a scene change without interrupting the music, leading into scene 10.

Scene 10: The Temple of the Sun
Sarastro announces the sun's triumph over the night, and hails the dawn of a new era of wisdom and brotherhood. Animals appear again and dance in the sun.

Some musical numbers 

Act 1
 "Der Vogelfänger bin ich ja" (The birdcatcher am I) – Papageno, scene 1
 "Dies Bildnis ist bezaubernd schön" (This image is enchantingly beautiful) – Tamino, scene 1
 "O zittre nicht, mein lieber Sohn" (Oh, tremble not, my beloved son) – The Queen of the Night, scene 1
 "Bei Männern, welche Liebe fühlen" (In men, who feel love) – Pamina and Papageno (duet), scene 2
 "Wie stark ist nicht dein Zauberton" (How strong is thy magic tone) – Tamino, finale
Act 2
 "O Isis und Osiris" (O Isis and Osiris) – Sarastro, scene 1
 "Alles fühlt der Liebe Freuden" (All feel the joys of love) – Monostatos, scene 3
 "Der Hölle Rache kocht in meinem Herzen" (Hell's vengeance boils in my heart) – The Queen of the Night, scene 3
 "In diesen heil'gen Hallen" (Within these sacred halls) – Sarastro, scene 3
 "Ach, ich fühl's, es ist verschwunden" (Ah, I feel it, it is vanished) – Pamina, scene 4
 "Ein Mädchen oder Weibchen" (A girl or a woman) – Papageno, scene 5
 "Pa–, pa–, pa–" – Papageno and Papagena, scene 10

Recordings

The first known recording of The Magic Flutes overture was issued around 1903, by the Victor Talking Machine Company and played by the Victor Grand Concert Band.

The first complete recording of The Magic Flute was of a live performance at the 1937 Salzburg Festival, with Arturo Toscanini conducting the Vienna Philharmonic and Vienna State Opera, though the recording was not officially issued until many years later. The first studio recording of the work, with Sir Thomas Beecham conducting the Berlin Philharmonic, was completed in 1938. Both of these historic recordings have been reissued on LP and compact disc. Since then there have been many recordings, in both audio and video formats.

Works inspired by The Magic Flute

See also

 List of operas by Mozart

Notes

References

Bibliography
 ; with supplementary footnotes by Cliff Eisen.

Further reading 
 
 
 
 
  see also Das Labyrinth

External links

Libretto, critical editions, diplomatic editions, source evaluation (German only), links to online DME recordings; Digital Mozart Edition
 Die Zauberflöte. Facsimile of Mozart's autograph
 
 Opera Guide, Synopsis, libretto, highlights
 Opera in a nutshell" Soundfiles (MIDI)
 Libretto and English translation from Aria-Database.com
 Frontispiece of the first edition libretto
 Brief programme notes from 2006 Opera Gold production, Goldsmiths, University of London
 San Diego OperaTalk! with Nick Reveles: Mozart's The Magic Flute, UC-TV and San Diego Opera

 
1791 in Austria
1791 operas
German-language operas
Operas
Operas adapted into films
Operas by Wolfgang Amadeus Mozart
Operas set in fictional, mythological and folkloric settings
Operas set in ancient Egypt
Singspiele